Home and Away is an Australian television soap opera. It was first broadcast on the Seven Network on 17 January 1988. The following is a list of characters that first appeared in 1989, by order of first appearance. They were all introduced by the show's executive producer Des Monaghan. The 2nd season of Home and Away began airing on 23 January 1989. The first introduction of the year was Martha Stewart in January. Rebecca Fisher made her first appearance in April. Emily Symons joined the cast as Marilyn Chambers in May. In June, the serial saw the birth of Duncan Stewart, the first child of Alf and Ailsa and  Mat Stevenson took on the role of Adam Cameron a fortnight later. Mouche Phillips joined as Viv Newton in July and September  saw the arrival of Dannii Minogue as Emma Jackson.

Martha Stewart

Martha Stewart initially appeared from 25 January to 13 February 1989, played by Alison Mulvaney. Martha was introduced as Alf Stewart's (Ray Meagher) first wife through a series of flashbacks. The character was reintroduced on 27 March 2018, and the role was recast to Belinda Giblin, who previously played Cynthia Ross in 1991. Meagher told Simon Timblick of the Radio Times that he may have suggested Giblin for the role, saying "When it was first mentioned to me they were thinking about bringing Martha back, they hadn't started looking and I said Belinda would be terrific. I don't know whether they looked any further, it was the perfect choice." Martha has the longest gap between appearances of any character on Home and Away.

Martha was reintroduced as part of the show's 30th anniversary celebrations. Alf tells their daughter Roo Stewart (Georgie Parker) that Martha did not die as previously thought, but she had in fact disappeared as she was unhappy with her life. Roo tries to find her mother, but is unsuccessful, until Martha makes her own way to Summer Bay. The character returns the following year, after receiving a phone call from Alf, which leads them to reconcile romantically. Meagher thought that Martha was probably the love of his life, despite his marriage to Ailsa Stewart (Judy Nunn). He also joked about that Martha being alive may have made Alf a bigamist. Martha temporarily leaves after her borderline personality disorder causes her anxiety.

Martha was married to Alf Stewart and is the mother of their daughter, Ruth "Roo" Stewart (then Justine Clarke). She was presumed drowned after a sailing accident in 1985. Martha appears in flashbacks when Bobby Simpson (Nicolle Dickson) reads her diary entries while searching for leads on her biological parents. It is revealed that Martha knew that Alf's sister, Morag Bellingham (Cornelia Frances) was Bobby's mother and subsequently had her adopted out to Al (George Leppard; Terence Donovan) and Doris Simpson.

Decades later, when he thinks he is going to die following an explosion, Alf tells Roo that Martha did not drown, as Roo had been led to believe, and is still alive. Martha comes to Summer Bay House and meets Ryder Jackson (Lukas Radovich), who asks if she wants to rent a caravan from Alf. She leaves, but later returns and comes face-to-face with Alf and then Roo. Martha explains that a friend informed her Roo had come looking for her. Roo and Martha talk, but when Roo asks why Martha left her all those years ago, Martha tells her she is tired and leaves. Martha later reveals that she has borderline personality disorder. She struggled to connect with Roo and could not face up to her condition, so she left. After seeking help and treatment, the guilt and fear stopped her from coming back, but she knew Roo would have a good life. Roo tells Martha that she gave Alf a hard time and had a daughter when she was sixteen, who she named after Martha. Roo asks Martha to have dinner with Alf, but she fails to show up. The following day, Martha comes to Summer Bay House to leave her contact details for Roo and she apologises to Alf, before explaining why she left. Roo tells Martha that she needs to leave, as her presence is hurting Alf, but she will visit her.

Months later, Alf calls Martha, but does not tell her why and soon hangs up on her. Martha comes to the Bay to ask him why he contacted her, but he tells her to go home. Alf later admits that he has missed her. He takes her out on his boat and Martha paints his portrait. She admits that she loves him and Alf is short with her, but after catching Martha packing her bags, they agree to see where things go between them. When Martha struggles to contact Roo, who is teaching in a remote area, she panics and works herself into a state. After Roo finally gets in contact, Martha calms down and explains to Alf that the anxiety is a result of her BPD. She decides to return home, and Alf later joins her. Upon their return to the Bay, they tell Roo that they are in a relationship. Martha leaves a few days later, having explained that she will continue to live in Marimbula. During her next visit to the Bay, Martha tells Roo that she is back to stay and Alf asks her to move in with him, which she later accepts. Martha initially struggles with the move and talks with Alex Neilson (Zoe Ventoura) about her mental health. Alex refers her to a specialist at the local hospital. After returning home from a trip, Alf and Martha learn that Mason Morgan (Orpheus Pledger) and Robbo (Jake Ryan) have died, which prompts Alf to suggest that they get married again. Martha initially turns him down, as she does not think he is being sincere, so Alf proposes properly and she accepts. They are married a week later and leave the Bay to visit Alf's sisters. Martha continues to maintain a home and studio in Marimbula, which causes tension between the couple when Alf wants Martha to sell up. Martha tells Roo that her home in Merimbula is the place she goes to heal when she suffers from BPD. She also tells Alf that it is her safety net and they make up. Martha is contacted by her son Kieran Baldivis (Rick Donald) and she confides in Irene Roberts (Lynne McGranger) about him. She decides to go to Merimbula to see him and tell him about her marriage to Alf. On her return to the Bay, she tells Alf about Kieran. He asks whether she would have told him if Kieran had not contacted her, but realises she probably would not have done. Martha then tells Roo that she has a half-brother, and explains that their relationship is complicated and he has not been in her life for a number of years. Martha admits to Alf and Roo that she was terrified she was going to lose them if they knew about Kieran. She also tells them that Kieran is keen to meet them and he soon shows up in the Bay.

Rebecca Nash 

Rebecca Nash debuted on screen during the episode airing on 3 April 1989. Belinda Emmett’s portrayal of  Rebecca earned her nominations for the "Best New Talent" Logie Award in 1997.
 and "Most Popular Actress" in 1998 and 1999. Emmett was also nominated for a Gold Logie in 1999. Emmett and her co-star Nic Testoni won "Best Couple" at the 1998 Inside Soap Awards and were nominated again in the same category the following year.

Marilyn Chambers 

Marilyn Chambers, played by Emily Symons, debuted on screen during the episode airing  on  18 May 1989. Symons departed the serial in 1992 but returned in  1995 for another regular stint which lasted until 1999. Dannii Minogue originally auditioned for the role of Marilyn, but she was given the role of Emma Jackson and Emily Symons was cast as Marilyn instead. Holy Soap called her "bubbly" and a "Dizzy blonde beautician".

Duncan Stewart 

Duncan Stewart made his first appearance in during the episode airing on 14 June 1989. Brendan McKensy's portrayal of Duncan earned him a  nomination for Best Young Actor at the 1999 Inside Soap Awards.

Adam Cameron 

Adam Cameron, played by Mat Stevenson, debuted on-screen during the episode airing on 28 June 1989. Stevenson had previously guested on rival soap opera Neighbours on Network Ten as petty criminal Skinner. In an interview with The Sun-Herald, he said that the chance to play Adam was a role-reversal and part in Neighbours helped him become more level-headed. Stevenson chose to move from his native Melbourne to Sydney for filming. Stevenson quit the serial in 1994 Stevenson describes  Adam is "a bit of a layabout" who is "capable of a kind word and good deed every now and then". However, Adam would "rather not" do either if doing so "interferes with having a good time or a lazy time". Stevenson said that he liked playing Adam, but noted he was nothing like his character because he is more responsible than Adam is. A columnist for Inside Soap said that Adam is a "one-time joker" and a "happy-go-lucky type of character".
Stevenson returned for a guest  stint in 1999 and admitted that not much had changed on the series. Stevenson told writer Jason Herbison of Inside Soap that he enjoyed playing Adam again so much that he considered asking the producer for a full-time return.

Viv Newton 

Viv Newton, played by Mouche Phillips, made her first appearance in on 5 July 1989 and departed on 25 May 1990. Phillips was sharing a house with Justine Clarke and began filming the week after Clarke had left the serial Phillips told a writer from Look-in that she liked to be kept busy on set. She explained that "people" were often left trying to find her because she was not where she should have been.

Emma Jackson 

Emma Jackson, played by Dannii Minogue, made her first on-screen appearance on 22 September 1989 and departed on 22 August 1990. Minogue originally auditioned for the role of Marilyn Chambers, but she was later cast in the role of Emma instead. Minogue stayed with the show for a year, before she quit to launch her music career in 1990. In October 2007, it was rumoured that Minogue was due to reprise her role as Emma for the show's 20th anniversary in 2008. However, she did not appear. For her portrayal of Emma, Minogue was nominated for the "Most Popular Actress on Australian Television" Logie Award in 1989. Holy Soap named Minogue as one of Home and Away's "Sexiest girls ever".

Others

References

External links 
 Characters and cast at the Official AU Home and Away website
 Characters and cast at the Official UK Home and Away website
 Characters and cast at the Internet Movie Database

, 1989
, Home and Away